The Hickory Ridge Cemetery Archeological Site (8ES1280) is an archaeological site in Pensacola, Escambia County Florida. It is located north of Big Lagoon and west of Pensacola. During excavations in the 1980s carbon dating was done on burnt wood fragments associated with burials in the mound, with a determination that the site had been used c. 1450. Analysis of ceramics suggested it was a Mississippian culture site, probably from the Late Bottle Creek Phase or Early Bear Point Phases of the Pensacola culture. It was a cemetery associated with a village nearby, (8ES1052). On September 22, 2000, it was added to the U.S. National Register of Historic Places.

References

External links
 Escambia County listings at National Register of Historic Places
 Escambia County listings at Florida's Office of Cultural and Historical Programs
 Hickory Ridge - A Mississippian Period Cemetery in Northwest Florida at University of West Florida

Pensacola culture
Native American history of Florida
Archaeological sites in Florida
Pre-Columbian archaeological sites
National Register of Historic Places in Escambia County, Florida